Colleen Quigley (born November 20, 1992) is an American middle-distance runner, steeplechase specialist and an Olympian from St. Louis, Missouri. She is the current World Record holder in the 4x1500 meters relay (set July 31, 2020). Competing in the 3000 meters steeplechase, she finished 8th at the 2016 Summer Olympics in Rio and 12th at the 2015 World Championships in Athletics in Beijing. She was the 2019 US National Indoor Champion in the one-mile event running 4:29.47 to capture the title and was the 2015 NCAA Champion in the 3000 meters steeplechase. In 2023, Quigley announced that she would start competing in triathlon events, but that she still plans to race track and field through 2024.

Professional
Quigley signed professionally with the Bowerman Track Club in June 2015. Later that year, she finished third in the steeplechase in 9:24.92 at the 2015 USA Outdoor Track and Field Championships, and finished 12th in the 3000 metres steeplechase event at the 2015 World Championships in Athletics in Beijing, China.

She ran 9:20.00 to place ninth in the Diamond League event, Meeting de Paris, 2016. Prior to that, Quigley had run a personal best time of 9:21.10 to place eighth in the 3000 metres steeplechase at the 2016 Summer Olympics. Quigley had also run a personal best time of 9:21.29 to place third in the steeplechase behind Team USA teammates Emma Coburn and Courtney Frerichs at the 2016 United States Olympic Trials to qualify to represent the United States at the 2016 Summer Olympics. On September 3, 2018, she lowered her steeplechase PR to 9:10.27 winning at ISTASF in Berlin, becoming the third-fastest American woman ever.

On June 30, 2019, she ran 9:11.41 to place seventh, and third American, in the star-studded Diamond League steeple at the Prefontaine Classic held in Stanford, California.

At the 2019 USA Indoor Track and Field Championships, she finished first in the mile in 4:29.27 to become the 2019 Indoor Mile Champion.

On February 27, 2020, Quigley ran a personal best of 8:28.71 in the 3000 meters at Boston University in a race made up of her Bowerman Track Club teammates Karissa Schweizer and Shelby Houlihan. This was faster than the previous American Record at this distance, 8:33.25 by Shalane Flanagan, but Quigley finished third behind her two teammates who also broke the record.

In a Bowerman Track Club inter-squad meet on July 31, 2020, Quigley competed as a member of the 4 x 1500 meter relay team alongside Elise Cranny, Karissa Schweizer and Shelby Houlihan. The team ran a time of 16:27.02 which broke the previous world record of 16:33.58 from Team Kenya by over 6 seconds.

Quigley announced on February 4, 2021 that she would be leaving Bowerman Track Club and coach Jerry Schumacher to be coached by her former Florida State University coach Josh Seitz.

On February 11, 2023, Quigley participated in her first triathlon at the Tritonman draft-legal development race in San Diego, California, finishing first in the overall sprint course.

NCAA
Colleen Quigley earned nine NCAA All-American honors while running for Florida State University.

She won 2015 the NCAA Women's Division I Outdoor Track and Field Championships Steeplechase title. She won 2015 Division 1 Atlantic Coast Conference Outdoor Track 1500 meters title.

Quigley earned 2015 Division 1 NCAA Indoor Women's Track and Field Championships Mile run bronze medal. She won 2015 Division 1 Atlantic Coast Conference Indoor Track Mile run and Distance medley relay titles. She won Boston University Terriers Invitational Mile run in a FSU record 4:29.67 and Distance medley relay titles. She won Auburn Tigers Invitational Mile run title.

She won 2014 NCAA Women's Division I Cross Country Championship Regional cross country running title. She won 2014 NCAA Women's Division I Cross Country Championship Atlantic Coast Conference cross country running silver medal. She won 2014 NCAA Women's Division I Cross Country Championship Virginia Tech Hokies Invitational and Lehigh Mountain Hawks Invitational titles.

She won 2014 Division 1 Atlantic Coast Conference Outdoor Track Steeplechase title. She won 2014 Division 1 Alabama Crimson Tide Invitational 1500 meters title. She won 2014 Division 1 Florida State Seminoles Invitational Steeplechase title.

She won 2014 Division 1 Atlantic Coast Conference Indoor Track Mile run title. She won 2014 Division 1 Washington Huskies Classic Distance medley relay title. She won 2014 Division 1 Indoor Track University of New Mexico Invitational 800 meters title.

She placed sixth 2013 NCAA Women's Division I Cross Country Championship national championships. She won 2013 NCAA Women's Division I Cross Country Championship Regional cross country running title. She earned silver medal 2013 NCAA Women's Division I Cross Country Championship Atlantic Coast Conference cross country running. She won 2013 NCAA Women's Division I Cross Country Championship Florida State Seminoles Invitational and earned Notre Dame Fighting Irish, Wake Forest Demon Deacons, Appalachian State Mountaineers Invitational silver medals.

Quigley earned 2013 Division 1 NCAA Outdoor Women's Track and Field Championship Steeplechase silver medal.

She placed twelfth 2012 NCAA Women's Division I Cross Country Championship national championships. She earned silver medal  at 2012 NCAA Women's Division I Cross Country Championship Regional championships. She placed fourth 2013 NCAA Women's Division I Cross Country Championship Atlantic Coast Conference cross country running. She won 2013 NCAA Women's Division I Cross Country Championship University of Louisville Cardinals Pre-national Invitational and won 2012 Notre Dame Fighting Irish Invitational title. She placed 4th at the Virginia Tech Hokies Invitational.

Quigley earned fifth place at 2012 Division 1 NCAA Outdoor Women's Track and Field Championship Steeplechase. She earned a silver medal at 2012 Division 1 Atlantic Coast Conference Outdoor Track Steeplechase final. She earned fourth at 2012 Division 1 Atlantic Coast Conference Indoor Track Mile run title.

High school
Quigley attended Nerinx Hall High School. She earned the 2010-11 Missouri Girls track and field Gatorade Player of the Year award. In 2011, she captured state titles in the 3200 meters and 1600 meters at the Outdoor Missouri High School Athletic Association Class 4 State Meet. Quigley finished 20th at 2010 Footlocker Cross Country Championships. During high school, her father, Gaylerd Quigley, was her cross country coach.

References

External links
 
 
 
 
 
 
 

1992 births
Living people
American female middle-distance runners
American female steeplechase runners
Athletes (track and field) at the 2016 Summer Olympics
Florida State Seminoles women's track and field athletes
Olympic track and field athletes of the United States
Track and field athletes from St. Louis
World Athletics Championships athletes for the United States
USA Indoor Track and Field Championships winners
21st-century American women